Lord Allen may refer to:

Viscount Allen, a title in the Peerage of Ireland
Clifford Allen, 1st Baron Allen of Hurtwood (1889–1939), British politician
Philip Allen, Baron Allen of Abbeydale (1912–2007), British civil servant
Alfred Allen, Baron Allen of Fallowfield (1914–1985), British trade unionist
Charles Allen, Baron Allen of Kensington (born 1957), British businessman and broadcaster